Wyra is a municipal council, town and mandal headquarters in Khammam district of Telangana, India.First Municipal chairman of wyra is Mr.Suthakani.Jaipal . The nearest city is Khammam. The nearest railway station is Khammam. The nearest airport is Vijayawada airport. There is one movie theatre – Vasavi Theatre. The present MLA of Wyra constituency is Lavudya Ramulu Nayak. This town is a Municipal council. The town is the main joint for Madhira, Khammam, Sathupally, Kothagudem and Tallada. Wyra Reservoir is a tourist attraction in Khammam district. The nearest bus station is TSRTC Wyra Bus Station. The assembly constituency contains Konijerla, Karepalli, Julurpadu, Enkoor and Wyra. Wyra was a revenue mandal of Khammam revenue division. There are some private schools. There are many function halls and restaurants in

References

See also
 Wyra Reservoir

Cities and towns in Khammam district